Künsebecker Bach is a river located in North Rhine-Westphalia, Germany. It rises in Hengeberg in Halle and flows northeast from Kölkebeck.

See also
List of rivers of North Rhine-Westphalia

References

Rivers of North Rhine-Westphalia
Rivers of Germany